Wu Yonggang (November 1, 1907 – December 18, 1982) was a prominent Chinese film director during the 1930s. Today Wu is best known for his directorial debut, The Goddess. Wu had a long career with the Lianhua Film Company in the 1930s, in Chongqing during the war, and in the mainland after the 1949 communist revolution.

Biography 
Wu Yonggang was born in Shanghai in 1907, but was considered a native of his ancestral home Wu County, Jiangsu in Chinese convention. Wu Yonggang was one of the major leftist film directors of pre-Communist China. For the early part of his career, Wu was a set designer with Dazhonghua Baihe, before transferring to the Shaw Brothers' Tianyi Film Company. He was eventually noticed by Shi Dongshan at the newly formed Lianhua Film Company. His first film from the director's chair, 1934's The Goddess (under contract with Lianhua), earned both him and the film's star, Ruan Lingyu, rave reviews. A prolific director, Wu continued to make films well into the 1970s until his retirement shortly before his death including Evening Rain (co-directed with Wu Yigong) which won Best Picture at the first annual Golden Rooster Awards.

Acclaimed director Chen Kaige referred to Wu Yonggang as one of his most admired directors, and named The Goddess as his favorite film of the 1930s.

Selected filmography

Notes

External links
 A brief biography of Wu Yonggang
 
 Wu Yonggang at the Chinese Movie Database

1907 births
1982 deaths
Film directors from Shanghai

Chinese silent film directors